Tiempo final, is a Colombian television series produced by Fox Telecolombia for Canal Uno and Canal Fox which aired from 2007 to 2009. It is an adaptation of the Argentinian series of the same name, written by Sebastián Borensztein and others,
 which aired from 2000 to 2002.

The series stars actors from a number of different countries, including Colombia, Mexico, Argentina, Perú and Venezuela.

Plot 
The stories in the series features apparently normal people who suddenly are exposed to extraordinary situations, and there are numerous plot twists.

Series overview

References

External links 

Colombian drama television series
2007 Colombian television series debuts
2009 Colombian television series endings
Spanish-language television shows